Carmarthen District Council was one of six local government districts of the county of Dyfed, west Wales, from 1974 to 1996.

History
The district was formed on 1 April 1974 under the Local Government Act 1972, covering the area of four former districts from the administrative county of Carmarthenshire, which were abolished at the same time:
Carmarthen Municipal Borough
Carmarthen Rural District
Newcastle Emlyn Rural District
Newcastle Emlyn Urban District

Carmarthen district was abolished 22 years later under the Local Government (Wales) Act 1994, with the area becoming part of the new Carmarthenshire unitary authority on 1 April 1996.

Political control
The first election to the council was held in 1973, initially operating as a shadow authority before coming into its powers on 1 April 1974. A majority of the seats on the council were held by independents throughout the council's existence.

The most significant political grouping (as distinct from the independents) was the Labour Party who held a number of seats in Carmarthen Town and the former mining wards of the Gwendraeth Valley.

Elections
 Carmarthen District Council election, 1973
 Carmarthen District Council election, 1976
 Carmarthen District Council election, 1979
 Carmarthen District Council election, 1983
 Carmarthen District Council election, 1987
 Carmarthen District Council election, 1991

Premises
Throughout its existence, the council was based at 3 Spilman Street in Carmarthen, which had previously been the offices of Carmarthen Rural District Council, one of its predecessor authorities.

References

 
Districts of Wales abolished in 1996
History of Carmarthenshire
1974 establishments in Wales
Carmarthen